The Uruguayan National Road Race Championships is a cycling race where the Uruguayan cyclists decide who will become the champion for the year to come.

Men

Elite

U23

Junior

Women

See also
Uruguayan National Time Trial Championships
National Road Cycling Championships

References

National road cycling championships
Cycle races in Uruguay